On 11 May 2019, at least eight people including four hotel employees, one soldier and three terrorists were killed in a terror attack targeting the Pearl Continental in Gwadar, Balochistan, Pakistan.

References

2019 in Balochistan, Pakistan 
2019 mass shootings in Asia
2019 murders in Pakistan 
21st-century mass murder in Pakistan
Attacks on hotels in Asia
Balochistan Liberation Army attacks
Gwadar District
Mass murder in 2019
Mass murder in Balochistan, Pakistan
Mass shootings in Pakistan
May 2019 crimes in Asia
May 2019 events in Pakistan
Terrorist incidents in Balochistan, Pakistan
Terrorist incidents in Pakistan in 2019
Deaths by firearm in Balochistan, Pakistan